Zygmunt J. Haas is a professor and distinguished chair in computer science, University of Texas at Dallas (UTD) also the professor emeritus in electrical and computer engineering, Cornell University. His research interests include ad hoc networks, wireless networks, sensor networks, and zone routing protocols.

Education
Haas received his BSc in electrical engineering in 1979 and MSc in electrical engineering in 1985. He earned his PhD from Stanford University in 1988.

Career
In 1988, he joined AT&T Bell Labs in the Network Research Department. There he pursued research on wireless communications, mobility management, fast protocols, optical networks, and optical switching. From September 1994 to July 1995, Haas worked for the AT&T Wireless Center of Excellence, where he investigated various aspects of wireless and mobile networking, concentrating on TCP/IP networks. Since August 1995, he has been with the faculty of the School of Electrical and Computer Engineering at Cornell University. Since August 2013, he joined the Computer Science Department at the University of Texas at Dallas, where he is now a Professor and Distinguished Chair. 
Haas is an active author in the fields of high-speed networking, wireless networks, and optical switching. He has organized several workshops, delivered numerous tutorials at major IEEE and ACM conferences, and has served as editor of several journals and magazines, including the IEEE Transactions on Networking, the IEEE Transactions on Wireless Communications, the IEEE Communications Magazine, the Springer Wireless Networks journal, the Elsevier Ad Hoc Networks journal, the Journal of High Speed Networks, and the Wiley Wireless Communications and Mobile Computing journal. He has been a guest editor of IEEE JSAC issues on "Gigabit Networks," "Mobile Computing Networks," and "Ad-Hoc Networks." Haas is an IEEE Fellow, an IET Fellow, and a Fellow of EAI. He has served in the past as a Chair of the IEEE Technical Committee on Technical Committee on Personal Communications (TCPC). His interests include mobile and wireless communication and networks, biologically-inspired networks, and modeling of complex systems.

Research
Haas has published over 300 technical papers, 21 patents and participated in the editing of 25 books or book chapters.

Selected publications
Zhou, Lidong, and Haas, Zygmunt J., "Securing ad hoc networks." IEEE network 13.6 (1999): 24-30.
Papadimitratos, Panagiotis, and  Haas, Zygmunt J., "Secure routing for mobile ad hoc networks." Communication Networks and Distributed Systems Modeling and Simulation Conference (CNDS 2002).San Antonio, TX, January 27–31, 2002.
Haas, Zygmunt J., "The zone routing protocol (ZRP) for ad hoc networks." IETF Internet draft, draft-ietf-manet-zone-zrp-01. txt (1998).
Haas, Zygmunt J., and Pearlman, Marc R., "The performance of query control schemes for the zone routing protocol." IEEE/ACM Transactions on Networking 9.4 (2001): 427-438.
Haas, Zygmunt J., "A new routing protocol for the reconfigurable wireless networks." Proceedings of ICUPC 97-6th International Conference on Universal Personal Communications. Vol. 2. IEEE, 1997.
Haas, Zygmunt J., Halpern, Joseph Y., and Li, Li, "Gossip-based ad hoc routing." Proceedings. Twenty-First Annual Joint Conference of the IEEE Computer and Communications Societies. Vol. 3, pp. 1707–1716 IEEE, 2002.
Haas, Zygmunt J., Halpern, Joseph Y., and Li, Li, "Gossip-based ad hoc routing." IEEE/ACM Transactions on Networking 14.3 (2006): 479-491.
Liang, Ben, and Haas, Zygmunt J., "Predictive distance-based mobility management for PCS networks."  IEEE INFOCOM'99. Conference on Computer Communications. Proceedings. Eighteenth Annual Joint Conference of the IEEE Computer and Communications Societies. The Future is Now (Cat. No. 99CH36320). Vol. 3, pp. 1377–1384, IEEE, 1999.
Small, Tara, and Haas, Zygmunt J., "The shared wireless infostation model: a new ad hoc networking paradigm (or where there is a whale, there is a way)." Proceedings of the 4th ACM international symposium on Mobile ad hoc networking & computing.pp. 233–244, 2003.
Haas, Zygmunt J., and Deng, Jing, "Dual busy tone multiple access (DBTMA)-a multiple access control scheme for ad hoc networks." IEEE transactions on communications 50.6 (2002): 975-985.
Pearlman, Marc R., and Haas, Zygmunt J., "Determining the optimal configuration for the zone routing protocol." IEEE Journal on Selected Areas in Communications 17.8 (1999): 1395-1414.
Haas, Zygmunt J., "Routing and mobility management protocols for ad-hoc networks." U.S. Patent No. 6,304,556. 16 Oct. 2001.
Deng, Jing, and Haas, Zygmunt J., "Dual busy tone multiple access (DBTMA): A new medium access control for packet radio networks." ICUPC'98. IEEE 1998 International Conference on Universal Personal Communications. Conference Proceedings (Cat. No. 98TH8384). Vol. 2, pp. 973–977, IEEE, 1998.
Small, Tara, and Haas, Zygmunt J., "Resource and performance tradeoffs in delay-tolerant wireless networks." Proceedings of the 2005 ACM SIGCOMM workshop on Delay-tolerant networking. pp. 260–267, 2005.
Haas, Zygmunt J., and Liang, Ben, "Ad hoc mobility management with uniform quorum systems." IEEE/ACM Transactions on Networking vol.7, no. 2, pp. 228–240, 1999.
Samar, Prince, Pearlman, Marc R. and Haas, Zygmunt J., "Independent zone routing: an adaptive hybrid routing framework for ad hoc wireless networks." IEEE/ACM Transactions on Networking vol.12, no.4, pp. 595–608, 2004.
Small, Tara, Haas, Zygmunt J, Purgue, Alejandro and Fristrup, Kurt, "A sensor network for biological data acquisition." Handbook on Sensor Networks (2004).
Wei, Hung-Yu, Ganguly, Samrat, Izmailov, Rauf and Haas, Zygmunt J., "Interference-aware IEEE 802.16 WiMax mesh networks." 2005 IEEE 61st Vehicular Technology Conference, vol. 5, pp. 3102–3106. IEEE, 2005.
Haas, Zygmunt J., and Liang, Ben, "Ad hoc mobility management with uniform quorum systems." IEEE/ACM Transactions on Networking vol.7, no.2, pp. 228–240, 1999.

Honors and awards

 Fellow of the Association for Computing Machinery, (ACM) 2021
 Fellow of the Institute of Electrical and Electronics Engineers (IEEE), January 2007, “for contribution to wireless and mobile ad hoc networks”
 Fellow of the European Alliance for Innovation (EAI), May 2019
 Fellow of the Institute of Engineering and Technology (IET), March 2019
 Fellow of the Asia-Pacific Artificial Intelligence Association (AAIA), June 2021
 2016 IEEE ComSoc AHSN Recognition Award (“for outstanding contributions to securing ad hoc and sensor networks") presented at IEEE Globecom 2016, December 5, 2016, Washington DC (AHSN Recognition Award); Cornell’s faculty awards 
 2012 IEEE ComSoc WTC Recognition Award (the award recognizes individuals for "outstanding technical contributions in the field and for his service to the scientific and engineering communities") presented at IEEE Globecom 2012, December 5, 2012, Anaheim, CA (WTC Recognition Awards)
 IEEE Distinguished Lecturer Tour, Scandinavian Countries, May 25 – June 5, 2009
 Distinguish Lecturer, IEEE Communications Society, (two terms) 01/2004 – 12/2005, 01/2005 – 12/2007
Elected Chair of the IEEE Technical Committee on Personal Communications (TCPC), Jan. 2001 – Nov. 2002 (previously elected Vice Chair and Secretary)

References

External links 
  Zygmunt J. Haas’s personal website
  Faculty in computer science, University of Texas at Dallas
  Faculty in Electrical and Computer Engineering, Cornell University

Fellow Members of the IEEE
University of Texas at Dallas faculty
1956 births
Living people
Electrical engineering academics
Cornell University faculty
Stanford University alumni
AT&T people
Fellows of the Association for Computing Machinery